"We Got the Power" (referred to as "We Got the Power (Version 2:18:482)" in the tracklist and the booklet) is a song by British alternative rock virtual band Gorillaz, featuring Jehnny Beth of British post-punk band Savages and backing vocals from former Oasis guitarist and songwriter Noel Gallagher and American rapper D.R.A.M., who also appears on the group's single "Andromeda". The song was released on 23 March 2017. It was released as the second single from their fifth studio album Humanz.

Background and recording
"We Got the Power" is the second single from the band's album Humanz and was produced by Damon Albarn, Remi Kabaka and the album's executive producer The Twilite Tone. The song features guest vocals from Jehnny Beth, the lead singer of the British band Savages as well as backing vocals from American rapper D.R.A.M. and Noel Gallagher. The song is a particular landmark for Albarn and Gallagher, after their public feud during what was dubbed by the media as "The Battle of Britpop" in the 1990s. At one point, the song featured backing vocals from Albarn's Blur bandmate Graham Coxon; however his vocals were removed from the final version of the song.

In an interview with Radio X, Albarn spoke of the song, saying "At one point this song had Graham, Noel and me on it and it was sort of heading slightly in the wrong direction. It was becoming almost retro in its sort of spirit and way too rocky for this record so I kind of stripped it right back down again. We play it slightly different live than how it is on the record. It's sort of the song that comes on during the final titles of a film. The climax. I thought Jehnny would take a bit of the testosterone off". He also spoke of working with Gallagher for the first time, which Albarn was very complimentary: "He's fantastic in the studio. It's nice when you see how someone goes about their business. He's great."

Music video

On 26 May, in collaboration with e.on, a music video for the song was released. The video shows a number of electrical toys and gadgets dancing in tune with the song with a toy version of the band appearing near the end of the song for the climax.

Track listing
Digital release single
 "We Got the Power" – 2:20
"We Got the Power" (Claptone Remix) – 6:05

Personnel
Damon Albarn – vocals, synthesizer, drums
Jean-Michel Jarre – synthesizer
Stephen Sedgwick – mixing engineer
The Twilite Tone – drums
Samuel Egglenton – bells, assistant
John Davis – mastering engineer, engineering
Jehnny Beth – vocals
Noel Gallagher – additional vocals
DRAM – additional vocals

Charts

References

2017 songs
2017 singles
English rock songs
British power pop songs
British new wave songs
British synth-pop songs
Gorillaz songs
Songs written by Damon Albarn
Parlophone singles
Warner Records singles
Songs written by Noel Gallagher